Gang is a hamlet in the parish of St Ive and Pensilva in east Cornwall, England, UK.

References

Hamlets in Cornwall